The 2002 La Flèche Wallonne was the 66th edition of La Flèche Wallonne cycle race and was held on 17 April 2002. The race started in Charleroi and finished in Huy. The race was won by Mario Aerts of the Lotto team.

General classification

References

2002 in road cycling
2002
2002 in Belgian sport